Mark King is the name of:

Mark King (musician) (born 1958), singer and bass guitar player with Level 42
Mark S. King (HIV/AIDS activist and writer) (born 1960)
Mark King (snooker player) (born 1974)
Mark King (footballer) (born 1988), English footballer
Mark King (politician), New Hampshire politician